ULW or ulw may refer to:

 Universal Living Wage (ULW), a project which was launched by Richard R. Troxell
 ulw, the ISO 639-3 code for Ulwa language, Nicaragua and Honduras